Neil Stevenson-Moore (Born December 12, 1980 -- North Vancouver, BC)is a Canadian retired ice hockey forward.

Playing career
Stevenson-Moore signed with the Edinburgh Capitals of the British Elite Ice Hockey League in September 2005. Prior to his signing he played four seasons for Princeton University where he amassed 21 goals and 45 points to go with 73 penalty minutes. In his first season for the Capitals, Stevenson-Moore registered 38 points, which consisted of 20 goals and 18 assists. At the end of the year Stevenson-Moore was named the Capitals’ Player of the Year. In 2006 he accepted an invite to play for the ECHL's Bakersfield Condors However, he was released prior to the start of the season. thus ending his career.

References

1980 births
Canadian ice hockey forwards
Edinburgh Capitals players
Living people
Merritt Centennials players
Princeton Tigers men's ice hockey players
Canadian expatriate ice hockey players in Scotland